Dorobaea is a genus of flowering plants in the daisy family, Asteraceae.

References

Senecioneae
Asteraceae genera